Calogaya pusilla is a species of saxicolous (rock-dwelling), crustose lichen in the family Teloschistaceae. It was originally formally described in 1852 by Italian lichenologist Abramo Bartolommeo Massalongo, who placed it in genus Physcia. The type specimen was collected in Veneto, Italy. It has undergone several changes of genus in its taxonomic history, including transfers to Caloplaca, Placodium, and Teloschistes. In 2013, it was placed in the newly circumscribed genus Calogaya.

Calogaya pusilla is common in Europe, and has been recorded from a few locations in the United States. Its typical habitat is on vertical, calcareous rock surfaces. It also occurs on walls with mortar.

References

Teloschistales
Lichen species
Lichens described in 1852
Lichens of Europe
Lichens of the United States
Taxa named by Abramo Bartolommeo Massalongo